Anthony Gilbert (born 26 July 1934) is a British composer and academic, long associated with the Royal Northern College of Music.

Biography
Gilbert, who was born in London on 26 July 1934, trained initially as a translator, then studied composition with Mátyás Seiber privately, with Denis Holloway at Trinity College, and with Alexander Goehr and Anthony Milner at Morley College. He also studied with Gunther Schuller at Tanglewood. 
Until 1970 he was working in London at Schotts the music publishers where he was Editor of contemporary music. In 1970 he became Granada Arts Fellow at Lancaster University and then went on to become first Tutor, then Head of the School of Composition at the Royal Northern College of Music, where he stayed until retirement in 1999. Amongst his students there were Sally Beamish, Tim Benjamin, Martin Butler, Simon Holt, Paul Newland, Janet Owen Thomas and James Saunders.

Gilbert has been an active committee member of the Society for the Promotion of New Music, the ICA Music Section, the British and Sydney Sections of the ISCM and the New Music Panel of North West Arts. He was founder member and artistic director of New Music Forum, Manchester. His memoirs, Kettle of Fish, were published in 2021. He is published by Schott Music (works prior to 1994) and the University of York Music Press (since 1994).

Music
Gilbert has been a prolific composer since the 1960s, the majority of works for instrumental or chamber ensemble. Early ensemble pieces include Brighton Piece and Nine or Ten Osannas (both 1967), and works especially written for The Fires of London, such as The Incredible Flute Music (1970) and Spell Respell for basset clarinet and piano (1973). From the 1970s he produced a series of larger orchestral compositions such as the Symphony (1973) and Ghost and Dream Dancing (1974), which Gilbert has called "in effect, a second symphony",  as well as two operas: The Scene-Machine (1970, for the Staatstheater Kassel) and The Chakravaka-Bird (1977, for BBC Radio). Compositions for smaller orchestra during this period included Crow-Cry (1976, written for the London Sinfonietta), and Towards Asvari for solo piano and chamber orchestra (1978, written for Peter Lawson and the Manchester Camerata).

During the following decade smaller scale works were his primary focus. Moonfaring for cello and percussion (1983) has also been performed with dancers. There are a trilogy of humorous pieces based on the imaginary Chinese bestiary of Jorge Luis Borges: Quartet of Beasts (1984). Beastly Jingles (1985) and Six of the Bestiary (1985). Other works from this time include Dream Carousels for wind ensemble (Gilbert’s most-performed work, written for RNCM conductor Timothy Reynish) and the orchestral song-cycle Certain Lights Reflecting. Both were inspired by writings of the Tasmanian poet Sarah Day. A recorder concerto written for John Turner, Igórochki, was completed in 1992 and a lyrical violin concerto, On Beholding a Rainbow, in 1997, recorded in 2005 with soloist Anthony Marwood.

Although not noted for his interest in traditional forms. Gilbert has composed three piano sonatas and a cycle of five string quartets spanning the years 1972 to 2009. The third quartet has been recorded by the Nossek String Quartet (1999), the Madawaska Quartet (2009) and the Bingham Quartet (2014), and the fourth by the Tavec Quartet (2009). He wrote an extended essay on the British String Quartet since 1935. There is also a string trio, Humdance (2007) and a string quintet, Haven of Mysteries, premiered by the Carducci String Quartet with cellist Guy Johnston at the Wigmore Hall on 14 June 2015.

Works

Piano
Elegy for piano, 1961
Piano Sonata no.1, 1962
Piano Sonata no.2 (piano 4-hands), 1966
Little Piano Pieces 8’, 1972
O alter Duft for piano (withdrawn), 1984
Funtoons: children’s pieces for piano (MS) 8’, 1985
Peal III for piano (MS) 2’, 1984
Piano Sonata no.3 (2001)
People Pieces for piano (beginners and on) 15’, 2005
Passing Bells for piano 3', 2006
Do Well: 8 short pieces for piano 15', 2009
Chimes in Time for piano, 7', 2010

Instrumental
Strophics for violin & piano, 1961
Duo for violin and viola, 1963
The Incredible Flute Music for flute and piano (Peal I), 1968
Spell Respell for electric basset clarinet and piano, 1968
Treatment of Silence for violin and tape, 1969
Crow Undersongs for solo viola 11’, 1981
Sunrising for oboe and piano (commissioned and published by Forsyth Bros. Ltd., Manchester) 3’, 1981
Two Birds by Kuring-Gai for horn and piano (commissioned and published by Forsyth) 6’, 1982
Moonfaring for cello and percussion 19'-30’, 1983
Dawnfaring for viola and piano 15’, 1984
Peal IV for organ (MS) 2’, 1984
O alter Duft for piano duet (withdrawn), 1990
Paluma for sopranino recorder and piano (arranged from movement IV of Igórochki) (MS) 4’, 1993
Trying to make John SLOW DOWN AFTER 50 for sopranino recorder and piano (Forsyth)**, 1993
Ziggurat for bass clarinet and marimba 21’, 1994
Stars for treble recorder and guitar (rev. 2004) 13’, 1995
Flame Robin for sopranino recorder solo (Forsyth) 1’, 1995
Miss Carroll her Lullabye for sopranino recorder and piano (Forsyth)**, 1995
Chant-au-clair for sopranino recorder and piano (Forsyth)**, 1995
Midwales Lightwhistle Automatic for sopranino recorder and piano (Forsyth)**, 1996
Réflexions, Rose nord for bass clarinet and vibraphone 5’, 1996
Osanna for Lady O for cello and piano (rewritten 2007) 8’, 1997
Ondine - chant au clair de lune for soprano and recorder (Aloysius Bertrand) (MS) 6', 1998
Os for oboe and vibraphone (revised 2002) 16’, 1999
Margareeting for tenor or descant recorder and piano (MS) 2’, 2000
Sinfin for vibraphone solo 8’, 2000 (also arranged for vibraphone duo)
Worldwhorls for bass clarinet solo 8’, 2000
Photos found at Hukvaldy, August 1928 for oboe solo 5’, 2000
Farings for sopranino recorder and piano (Forsyth) 15’, 2000
Piano Sonata no.3 autour des palombes 15', 2001
Kauri for solo Tuba 11’, 2002
Tulip Tree Dances for solo bass and treble recorders 15’, 2003
Rose luisante for solo freebass accordion 9’, 2003
Litany for clarinet and piano (Associated Board Spectrum series) 2’, 2004
Catercorny, four pieces for clarinet and piano (contains Litany above) 6', 2004
Swallowtail for solo vibraphone 2', 2004
Halifenu Vine Dance for organ and pre-recorded organ 9', 2005
A Piece of Cake for treble recorder and piano (MS) 80", 2006
Jugalbandi Blues for bass clarinet solo 60", 2006
Echo for solo trumpet (Cincuentas 5) 4', 2007
Twirlpool for flute and viola 3', 2008
Gioco dei Pari for violin & viola (reworking of Duo of 1962) 10', 2008
Twinned Set, seven short pieces for solo bassoon (and Set 2 for bass clarinet) 18', 2008
 Rapprochement for piano and cello, 8', 2011
 Pilbara Park, solo guitar, 2012
 The Flame has Ceased (in memory John McCabe), 2016
 Verse for solo double bass (written for David Hayes), 2019
 Duologue - small sonata for viola & piano, 2020

Chamber ensemble
Serenade for 6 instruments, 1963
Brighton Piece for 8 players, 1967
Nine or Ten Osannas for 5 players, 1967
O’Grady Music for clarinet, cello and toy instruments 24’, 1971
String Quartet I (also available in arrangement with piano) 22’, 1972
Canticle I (Rock-Song), for wind instruments 9’, 1973
Canticle I (Rock-Song) version 2, for woodwind, horns, harp & piano 9', 1979
Calls around Chungmori for chamber ensemble and participating audience 15’, 1979
Vasanta with Dancing for chamber ensemble (dancer optional) 17’, 1981
Bendigo Match for wind band (MS) 3', 1981
Concert Fanfare for Strathfieldsaye for 5 brass and 2 perc. (MS) 1', 1981
Little Fantasy on Gold-digger Melodies for flute and string quartet (MS) 4', 1981
Little Dance of Barrenjoey for fl.,cl., vla, vc. (MS) 2’, 1981
Quartet of Beasts for 3 wind instruments and piano 13’, 1984
Six of the Bestiary for saxophone quartet 12’, 1985
Fanfarings for 6 and 8 brass instruments (MS) 5 x 1’, 1986
String Quartet II (revised 2003) 19’, 1987
String Quartet III super hoqueto 'David' 7’, 1987
Tree of Singing Names for chamber orchestra 15’, 1989
Fanfaring V for brass (MS) 1’, 1992
Moon comes up, Pearl Beach (June ‘79) for alto flute, vibraphone and cello (version 2, MS lost) 1’, 1995
Dancing to the Tune for 4-8 oboes, 2-4 cors anglais, 1-2 heckelphones (MS) 4’, 1996
Sinfin 2 for 4 vibraphones 8’, 2000
Unrise for ten wind instruments 16’, 2001
Four Seasons for Josca’s for young players (variable ens.) 3’, 2001
String Quartet IV 23’, 2002
Ondine (version 2, extended), soprano + recorder, cello, hpschd. 11’, 2003
Palace of the Winds for 11 solo strings 15’, 2003
Tinos for soprano, clarinet and vibraphone (Magdalena Mismareza) 3’, 2004
Dark Singing, Dancing Light for bassoon and string quintet/string ens. 10', 2005
ecco Eco for flute, clarinet & vibraphone (Cincuentas 4) 50", 2007
HumDance for string trio 20', 2007
York Surprise for flute, clarinet & bass clarinet 8', 2007
Word-Chimes in the Wind for wind quintet 18', 2008
String Quartet no. 5 20', 2009
Hope's Place, for chamber ensemble, 18', 2013
Tryptych, for three winds and string ensemble, 16', 2014
 Haven of Mysteries, string quintet, 2015
 La Douceur, septet for three winds and string quartet, 2016
 Return of the St Louis, trio for oboe, clarinet in A and bassoon, 2017

Choral and vocal
Missa Brevis for unaccompanied choir, 1965
Assonants 1for SATB soli + clarinet & horn, 1965
Three War Poems for chorus, 1966
Shepherd Masque for young voices, 1968
Love Poems for soprano and instrumental ensemble (2 versions) 10’, 1970
Cantata: the man who tried to hijack an airliner 16’ (withdrawn), 1971
Canticle II (Anger) for 6 male voices 6’, 1974
Inscapes for soprano, speaking voice and small ensemble 30’, 1975
Long White Moonlight for soprano and electric double bass 18’, 1980
Chant of Cockeye Bob for children’s voices and instruments 14’, 1981
Victorian Round for any number of voices (MS), 1981
Beastly Jingles for soprano and instrumental ensemble 11’, 1984
Certain Lights Reflecting song-cycle for mezzo-soprano and orchestra (to poems of Sarah Day) 19’, 1989
Upstream River Rewa for storyteller and Indo-European ensemble 29’, 1991
Little Cycle for Elizabeth Yeoman for soprano, cello and piano (MS) 7’, 1992
Handles to the Invisible for a cappella choir (to poems of Sarah Day) (rev. 2003) 15’, 1995
This Tree (Frances Horovitz) [no.1 of Love Poems (1970), arr. mezzo and piano] (Schott) 3’, 1996
Vers de Lune, soprano plus flute, cello, percussion (Aloysius Bertrand) (incorporates a version of Ondine - chant au clair... above) 17’, 1999
Encantos song-cycle to Spanish symbolist love poetry for soprano or mezzo + clarinet, vibraphone, guitar (Magdalena Mismareza & anon.) 14', 2004
Ygg-drasill for soprano or mezzo + recorder, ob., cl., bsn, trp., 3 vlns, vc. (Cincuentas 3) 9', 2006
En Bateau, d'après Watteau for soprano, recorder, oboe, violin & cello (to poems by Baudelaire & Proust) 9', 2007
Those Fenny Bells for treble, counter-tenor and vibraphone (poem by John Clare) 3', 2008
 Lay the Lances, five songs for baritone and string orchestra, 2018

Orchestral
Sinfonia for chamber orchestra, 1965
Regions for two orchestras, 1966
Peal II for big band, 1968
Symphony (incorporates modified version of Regions) 39’, 1973
Ghost and Dream Dancing for orchestra 19’, 1974
Crow-Cry for chamber orchestra 20’, 1976
Welkin for orchestra 11’, 1976
Koonapippi for youth orchestra 6’, 1981
Dream Carousels for orchestra of wind 13’, 1984
Mozart Sampler with Ground for orchestra 10’, 1991
...into the Gyre of a Madder Dance for orchestral wind, 7’, 1994
Another Dream Carousel for string orchestra 8’, 2000
Even in flames,/the Thames/can’t hold a candle/to the Wandle for variable orchestra 6’, 2000
Sheer for string orch. 16’, 2003
Dance Concerto - Groove by chants, for orchestra 19', 2006
 Lifelines, roundelay for orchestra, 2020
 Liaison, tone poem for medium-sized orchestra, 2021

Concertante
Mother, for solo cello and ensemble
Towards Asâvari for piano and chamber orchestra 22’, 1978
Igórochki, concerto for recorder, 1992
On beholding a Rainbow, concerto for violin and orchestra 30’, 1997
 A Melding, concerto for Bb clarinet and chamber ensemble, 2019

Dramatic
The Scene-Machine one-act opera, libretto by George MacBeth 50’, 1970
The Chakravaka-Bird radio opera (libretto trans. from Indian sources by A. K. Ramanujan, Daniel H. H. Ingalls and A. Gilbert) (contact composer) 77’, 1977

Arrangements
Guillaume de Machaut: Ma fin est mon commencement, arr. recorder ensemble with tambour (MS) 4', 1981
Arthur Benjamin: Two Jamaican Street Songs, arr. piano 4h. (Boosey), 1990
Mátyás Seiber: Burlesque from Pastorale & Burlesque, arr. recorder and piano; also arr. recorder and string trio (Schott), 2005

References

Further reading
Connolly, Justin. 1968. "Cornelius Cardew's The Great Digest and Anthony Gilbert's Missa brevis". Tempo 86:16–17.
Henderson, R. 1971–72.  "Anthony Gilbert". Music and Musicians 20, no. 7:42–49.
Hopkins, G.W. 1968. "Anthony Gilbert". Musical Times 109:907–10.
Jarman, Douglas. 2004. "The Music of Anthony Gilbert", 2 parts. Tempo 58, no. 229 (July): 2–17; 58, no. 230 (October): 38–49.
Kennedy, Michael (2006), The Oxford Dictionary of Music, 985 pages,  
Walsh, Stephen. 1972. "Time Off and The Scene Machine". Musical Times 113:137–39.
Williams, Nicholas. 2001. "Gilbert, Anthony". The New Grove Dictionary of Music and Musicians, second edition, edited by Stanley Sadie and John Tyrrell. London: Macmillan Publishers.

External links
 Anthony Gilbert official website
 Anthony Gilbert introduces his work Nine or Ten Osannas

British classical composers
British male classical composers
20th-century classical composers
21st-century classical composers
1934 births
Living people
20th-century British composers
21st-century British composers
20th-century British male musicians
21st-century British male musicians